Chalcoprionus is a genus of longhorn beetles in the family Cerambycidae. It is monotypic, being represented by the single species, Chalcoprionus badeni.

References

Prioninae